Achy Obejas (born June 28, 1956) is a Cuban-American writer and translator focused on personal and national identity issues, living in Benicia, California. She frequently writes on her sexuality and nationality, and has received numerous awards for her creative work. Obejas' stories and poems have appeared in Prairie Schooner, Fifth Wednesday Journal, TriQuarterly, Another Chicago Magazine and many other publications. Some of her work was originally published in Esto no tiene nombre, a Latina lesbian magazine published and edited by tatiana de la tierra, which gave voice to the Latina lesbian community. Obejas worked as a journalist in Chicago for more than two decades. For several years, she was also a writer in residence at the University of Chicago, University of Hawaii, DePaul University, Wichita State University, and Mills College in Oakland, California. She also worked from 2019-22 as a writer/editor for Netflix on the bilingual team in the Product Writing department.

Obejas practices activism through writing, by telling her own story about her identity, as well as others. Written in collaboration with Megan Bayles, the anthology Immigrant Voices: 21st Century Stories, is a collection of stories that seeks to describe the experience of people who have emigrated to America. While most anthologies focus on one group, this anthology expands the perspective to multiple group identities.

Personal life
Obejas was born June 28, 1956, in Havana, Cuba. After emigrating to the United States at the age of six, she lived in Michigan City, Indiana, and attended Indiana University from 1977 to 1979, when she moved to Chicago.

Nationality
At the age of 39, Obejas revisited Cuba. Reflections on her home country are dispersed throughout her work, such as in the story collection We Came All the Way from Cuba So You Could Dress Like This? Although she has lived in the Midwest since childhood, Obejas says her Cuban origins continue to be a defining detail in her life. In an interview with Gregg Shapiro, Obejas discussed the peculiar duality of growing up in the U.S. but not truly identifying as an American:

I was born in Havana and that single event has pretty much defined the rest of my life. In the U.S., I'm Cuban, Cuban-American, Latina by virtue of being Cuban, a Cuban journalist, a Cuban writer, somebody's Cuban lover, a Cuban dyke, a Cuban girl on a bus, a Cuban exploring Sephardic roots, always and endlessly Cuban. I'm more Cuban here than I am in Cuba, by sheer contrast and repetition.

Sexuality
Obejas identifies as a lesbian and frequently references sexuality in her writing. Although she often writes about her characters' struggles with sexuality and family acceptance, in an interview with Chicago LGBT newspaper Windy City Times, she said she did not experience significant family problems because of her sexuality:

Remember, Cuba was known as the brothel of the Caribbean prior to the revolution. People went to Cuba to do the things they couldn't do in their home countries, but were free to do there. So Cubans have a sort of thick skin to most sexual stuff, which is not to say that my parents did, but as a general rule in the environment and the culture, there's a lot more possibility. I never had any sense of shame or anything like that.

On a personal level, Obejas says she always accepted her sexual identity as part of herself:

In terms of my own sexuality, I don't know what it was, but I just never blinked. I was always amazed when other people did; I was always sort of flabbergasted when people would suffer angst about it. I understood that it was taboo and all of that, but I chalked it up as a kind of a generational problem.

Career
She earned an M.F.A from Warren Wilson College in 1993. She was the Springer Lecturer in Creative Writing (2003–05) at the University of Chicago, as well as an advisor for the online prose magazine Otium. In fall of 2005, she served as the Distinguished Writer in Residence at the University of Hawaiʻi. She was the Sor Juana visiting writer at DePaul University from 2006 to 2012. From 2013 to 2019, she served as the Distinguished Visiting Writer at Mills College, where she founded a Low-Residency MFA in Translation Program.

In 2008, she translated Junot Diaz's Pulitzer Prize-winning novel, The Brief and Wondrous Life of Oscar Wao, into Spanish. The Dominican-American author's novel addresses many themes, including young adult sexuality and national identity, also present in Obejas' work. She's also translated work by Rita Indiana, Wendy Guerra, Adam Mansbach, Carlos Velazquez, F.G. Haghenbeck, and many others. She is the rare translator who can work in and out of both English and Spanish.

Obejas has written the novels Ruins, Memory Mambo and Days of Awe, and the story collection We Came All the Way from Cuba So You Could Dress Like This? as well as the poetry chapbook This is What Happened in Our Other Life. A new collection of short stories, "The Tower of Antilles & Other Stories" is coming from Akashic in 2017.

In a reflection on Obejas' work, Latina comedian Lisa Alvarado says of the writer, "Her work exudes a keen sense of humor, of irony, of compassion and is laced with the infinite small moments that make her poetry and her novels sing with the breath of real life."

Journalism
Throughout her career, Obejas has worked for many different publications, including the Chicago Tribune, Windy City Times, The Advocate, Out, Vanity Fair, Playboy, Ms., The Village Voice, and The Washington Post. Currently, she contributes to In These Times.

As a Chicago Tribune columnist for nearly ten years, Obejas penned the nightlife column "After Hours". The column started when then-Friday section editor Kevin Moore asked the self-described insomniac if she would like to cover nighttime entertainment for the paper. In 2001, Obejas announced that she would no longer write the column.

Works

Novels
Memory Mambo (1996)
Days of Awe (2001)
Ruins (2009)

Collections
We Came All the Way from Cuba So You Could Dress Like This? (1994) (stories)
This Is What Happened In Our Other Life (2007) (poems)
The Tower of the Antilles (2017) (stories)

Other
Havana Noir (2007) (translator and editor)
La Breve y Maravillosa Vida de Oscar Wao (2008) (translator)
"Immigrant Voices: 21st Century Stories" (2014) (co-editor with Megan Bayles)
Papi by Rita Indiana (2016) (translator)
Boomerang / Bumerán (poetry) (2021)

Awards
Obejas has received a Pulitzer Prize for her work in a Chicago Tribune team investigation, the Studs Terkel Journalism Prize, several Peter Lisagor journalism honors, and two Lambda Literary awards.

She has also been a National Endowment for the Arts fellow in poetry and served residencies at Yaddo, Ragdale and the Virginia Center for the Arts.

In 2010 she was inducted into the Chicago Gay and Lesbian Hall of Fame.

In 2014, she was awarded a USA Ford Fellowship for literature and translation.

See also

List of Cuban American writers
List of LGBT writers

References

External links

Official site
Marika Preziuso (October 2010). "Interview with Achy Obejas" sx salon. Retrieved 12 April 2010.
Otium

1956 births
20th-century American novelists
21st-century American novelists
20th-century American women writers
21st-century American women writers
20th-century American poets
21st-century American poets
20th-century American translators
21st-century American translators
20th-century American non-fiction writers
21st-century American non-fiction writers
21st-century American LGBT people
American women novelists
American women poets
American writers of Cuban descent
Cuban emigrants to the United States
DePaul University faculty
English–Spanish translators
Hispanic and Latino American novelists
Hispanic and Latino American poets
Hispanic and Latino American women journalists
Lambda Literary Award for Lesbian Fiction winners
American lesbian writers
LGBT Hispanic and Latino American people
Cuban LGBT poets
Cuban LGBT novelists
Living people
People from Havana
People from Michigan City, Indiana
Writers from Chicago
American LGBT poets
American LGBT novelists
American women journalists
Cuban women writers
Cuban lesbian writers
Novelists from Indiana
Novelists from Illinois
American women academics
Lesbian novelists